Zangelan or Zangilan may refer to: 

In Azerbaijan:
 Zangilan, a town that is located in the Zangilan District of Azerbaijan
 Zangilan (village), a village that is located in the Zangilan District of Azerbaijan
 Zangilan District, an administrative territorial entity in the south-western part of the Republic of Azerbaijan

In Iran:
 Zangelan, Iran (disambiguation)